Sergio Daniel Ponce (born 9 January 1984) is an Argentine footballer who currently plays for Panegialios in the Greek Football League as an attacking midfielder or winger.

Career
Ponce began his professional playing career in 2004 with Chacarita Juniors in the Argentine 2nd division. Between 2008 and 2009 he was loaned to Greek side Panthrakikos F.C. He returned to play for Chacarita Juniors in 2009 after the club's promotion to the Primera División. Managers Player (Agente Jugador) Ms Marcos Garzia Argentine..

External links
 

1984 births
Living people
People from San Martín, Buenos Aires
Argentine footballers
Association football midfielders
Argentine expatriate footballers
Expatriate footballers in Greece
Super League Greece players
Chacarita Juniors footballers
Panthrakikos F.C. players
Deportivo Morón footballers
Athlitiki Enosi Larissa F.C. players
Olympiacos Volos F.C. players
Paniliakos F.C. players
Panegialios F.C. players
Sportspeople from Buenos Aires Province